The 2006 Cupa României Final was the 68th final of Romania's most prestigious cup competition. The final was played at the Stadionul Naţional in Bucharest on 17 May 2006 and was contested between Liga I sides Rapid București and Naţional București. The cup was won by Rapid.

Route to the final

Match details

References
 Romanian Cup 2005/2006 (RomanianSoccer)

Cupa Romaniei Final, 2006
2005-06
2006